Irshad Umar (born 14 June 1995) is a Sri Lankan cricketer. He made his List A debut for Nuwara Eliya District in the 2016–17 Districts One Day Tournament on 21 March 2017. He made his first-class debut for Moors Sports Club in the 2018–19 Premier League Tournament in Sri Lanka on 28 December 2018.

References

External links
 

1995 births
Living people
Sri Lankan cricketers
Moors Sports Club cricketers
Nuwara Eliya District cricketers
Place of birth missing (living people)